Associação Académica de Espinho is a sports club based in Espinho, Portugal. It has a volleyball team playing in Portuguese Volleyball League A1, a roller hockey team (in Second Division) and a women's handball team.

Achievements
 Portuguese Volleyball League A1: 1
1989/90

External links

Mundook on AA Espinho

Portuguese volleyball teams
Sport in Espinho, Portugal